"Ami Banglay Gaan Gai" is a patriotic song by Bengali poet and composer and singer Pratul Mukhopadhyay. The song was elected as sixth greatest Bengali song of all time by BBC Bangla.

Lyrics

See also 
 "Amar Sonar Bangla"

References

Further reading
 

Bangladeshi songs
Bengali-language songs
1994 songs